Francisca María Brockmann y Llanos (1867–1946) was a Spanish historical painter.

Brockmann was born in Madrid as the granddaughter of Fanny Keats (the sister of the poet), whose portrait she painted. Her uncle Juan Llanos y Keats gave her painting lessons and she also studied with the history painter José Benlliure y Gil, where she was influenced by Joaquin Sorolla. She won awards in 1887 and 1892 at the Exposiciones Nacionales de Bellas Artes.

Her painting Outside a Roman Hostelry was included in the 1905 book Women Painters of the World.

References

External links
 
 

1867 births
1946 deaths
19th-century Spanish painters
19th-century Spanish women artists
20th-century Spanish women artists
Artists from Madrid
Spanish people of English descent
Spanish women painters